Martha Gehman (born 1955) is an American actress and acting coach, perhaps best known for her role as Ophelia in the 1985 cult classic The Legend of Billie Jean.<ref>Pantoga, Elfrieda. Billie Jean Pulls Punches, Milwaukee Sentinel, July 26, 1985</ref>

She also had supporting roles in The Flamingo Kid, F/X'', Threesome
and A Kiss Before Dying.

Gehman has a twin sister, Abbie, and is the daughter of actress Estelle Parsons and Richard Gehman. Her nephew is football player Eben Britton.

Filmography

Film

Television

References

External links
 

American film actresses
1955 births
Living people
20th-century American actresses
American twins
American people of Swedish descent
21st-century American women
Place of birth missing (living people)